Gerhard Stoltz (1923 – 1991) was a Norwegian economist.

Born in Bergen, he took the dr.philos. degree in 1959 with the thesis Arbeidstidsproblemer. He was hired in 1962 as a professor at the Norwegian School of Economics, and served as rector there from 1979 to 1984.

References

1923 births
1991 deaths
Academic staff of the Norwegian School of Economics
Rectors of the Norwegian School of Economics
20th-century  Norwegian economists